International Chornobyl Disaster Remembrance Day is a remembrance day, observed annually on April 26. It was established by the United Nations General Assembly on December 8, 2016, in memory of Chernobyl disaster.

In its resolution, the General Assembly recognized that three decades after the disaster there remains persistent serious long-term consequences and that the affected communities and territories are experiencing continuing related needs. The General Assembly invites all Member States, relevant agencies of the United Nations system and other international organizations, as well as civil society, to observe the day.

See also
 Chornobyl Children International

References

External links
 International Chernobyl Disaster Remembrance Day 26 April
 20 years after Chornobyl Catastrophe. Future outlook: National Report of Ukraine.– K.: Atika, 2006.– 216 p.

April observances
United Nations days
Remembrance days
Aftermath of the Chernobyl disaster